The South Washington Street Historic District is located in Watertown, Wisconsin.

History
The district is largely made up of large, upscale houses. Jesse Stone, a Lieutenant Governor of Wisconsin, resided in what is now the district. It was added to the State and the National Register of Historic Places in 2003.

References

Historic districts on the National Register of Historic Places in Wisconsin
National Register of Historic Places in Jefferson County, Wisconsin